Strategies Against Architecture III (Strategien gegen Architekturen III) (1991-2001, double CD) is an album by Einstürzende Neubauten and was released in 2001.

This album featured a retrospective overview of the previous decade of the band's music. It is the third Einstürzende Neubauten release of this type, preceded by Strategies Against Architecture II (1991) and Strategies Against Architecture 80-83 (1984).

Track listing

Disc one
 "Zentrifuge" (4:48)
 "12305(te Nacht)" (4:11)
 "Für Wen Sind Die Blumen?" (4:24)
 "Redukt" (9:40) (live)
 "Ende Neu" (6:19) (live)
 "Blume" (4:30) (French version)
 "Three Thoughts (Devil's Sect)" (4:37)
 "Implosion" (1:32)
 "Scampi Alla Carlina" (2:45)
 "Snake" (3:35)
 "Alles Was Irgendwie Nützt" (8:08) (live)
 "The Garden" (5:13)
 "Anrufe In Abwesenheit" (4:18)
 "Querulanten" (0:58)

Disc two
 "Architektur Ist Geiselnahme" (5:04)
 "Helium" (3:12)
 "Wüste" (3:49) (ballet version)
 "Der Leere Raum" (1:59)
 "Was Ist Ist" (4:17) (extended version)
 "I Wish This Would Be Your Colour" (8:11) (live)
 "Bili Rubin" (3:00)
 "Die Interimsliebenden" (7:16)
 "Installation Nr. 1 (John Is Mixing)" (3:46)
 "Montblanc" (0:29)
 "Open Fire" (4:28)
 "Salamandrina" (2:59)
 "Letztes Bild" (3:54)
 "Silence Is Sexy" (6:00)
 "Drachen" (2:07)

Personnel
 Blixa Bargeld - lead vocals, guitars
 Marc Chung - guitar, vocals
 Jochen Arbeit - guitar, vocals
 Alexander Hacke - bass, vocals
 N.U. Unruh - percussion, vocals
 F.M. Einheit - percussion, vocals
 Rudolph Moser - percussion, vocals
 Anita Lane - lead vocals on "Blume"

References

Einstürzende Neubauten compilation albums
2001 compilation albums
Mute Records compilation albums